Marián Cisár (born February 25, 1978) is a Slovak former professional ice hockey player. He last played for the Hannover Scorpions of the Deutsche Eishockey Liga. He previously played for the Nashville Predators of the National Hockey League and Milwaukee Admirals of the American Hockey League.

Playing career
As a youth, Cisár played in the 1992 Quebec International Pee-Wee Hockey Tournament with a team from Bratislava.

Cisár played junior hockey for the Spokane Chiefs in the Western Hockey League. He was drafted 37th overall by the Los Angeles Kings of the National Hockey League in the 1996 NHL Entry Draft, but was traded to the Nashville Predators for future considerations without ever having played for the Kings. He played in 73 regular season games for Nashville between 1999 and 2002, recording 30 points (13 goals and 17 assists). In 2004, he suffered a concussion playing for the Hannover Scorpions in Germany which ended his season after just 14 games.

He represented the Slovakia national team, and played in 15 games.

Career statistics

References

External links
 
 

1978 births
Hannover Scorpions players
HC Slovan Bratislava players
Living people
Los Angeles Kings draft picks
Lukko players
Milwaukee Admirals players
Milwaukee Admirals (IHL) players
Nashville Predators players
Nürnberg Ice Tigers players
Orli Znojmo players
Slovak expatriate ice hockey players in Germany
Slovak ice hockey right wingers
Spokane Chiefs players
Ice hockey people from Bratislava
Slovak expatriate ice hockey players in the United States
Slovak expatriate ice hockey players in the Czech Republic
Slovak expatriate ice hockey players in Finland